Tulosesus angulatus is a species of mushroom producing fungus in the family Psathyrellaceae.

Taxonomy 
First described by mycologist Charles Horton Peck in 1874 and placed in the genus Coprinus.

In 2001 a phylogenetic study resulted in a major reorganization and reshuffling of that genus and this species was transferred to Coprinellus.

The species was known as Coprinellus angulatus until 2020 when the German mycologists Dieter Wächter & Andreas Melzer reclassified many species in the Psathyrellaceae family based on phylogenetic analysis.

References

angulatus
Fungi described in 1874
Fungi of Europe
Taxa named by Charles Horton Peck
Tulosesus